The Division of Lowe was an Australian Electoral Division in the state of New South Wales. It was located in the inner western suburbs of Sydney, on the south shore of the Parramatta River. It included the suburbs of Drummoyne, Five Dock, Croydon, Croydon Park, Burwood, Enfield, Homebush, Strathfield, Concord, Rhodes, Canada Bay, Cabarita, Abbotsford and Mortlake.

The division was named after the Rt Hon Robert Lowe, 1st Viscount Sherbrooke, a former Member of the New South Wales Legislative Council, and former Home Secretary of the United Kingdom. The division was proclaimed at the redistribution of 11 May 1949, and was first contested at the 1949 federal election. It was first held by Sir William McMahon, who retained the seat for over 32 years, until 1982.  He was prime minister from 1971 to 1972.

Following the 2009 redistribution of NSW, the seat of Lowe was abolished for the 2010 Australian federal election. Most of the area of Lowe, together with a small part of the seat of Reid to its west, were reconstituted as the new Reid.

Members

Election results

2007

References

Psephos: Adam Carr's Election Archive
The Poll Bludger
ABC Elections
Australian Electoral Commission

External links
  (PDF, 184 kB)

Lowe
Constituencies established in 1949
Constituencies disestablished in 2010